Exallodontus aguanai is a catfish species (order Siluriformes) of the monotypic genus Exallodontus of the family Pimelodidae. This genus and species was described in 1991. This species reaches  SL.  This species is native to the Amazon and Orinoco River basins of Brazil, Colombia, Peru and Venezuela. Exallodontus is classified under the "Calophysus-Pimelodus clade". Within this clade, it is considered a part of the "Pimelodus-group" of Pimelodids, which also includes Pimelodus, Duopalatinus, Cheirocerus, Iheringichthys, Bergiaria, Bagropsis Parapimelodus, Platysilurus, Platystomatichthys, and Propimelodus.

References

Pimelodidae
Catfish of South America
Freshwater fish of Brazil
Freshwater fish of Colombia
Fish of Peru
Fish of Venezuela
Fish of the Amazon basin
Fish described in 1991
Taxa named by Francisco Mago Leccia